Beth Israel Hospital may refer to:

Beth Israel Deaconess Medical Center in Boston, including the former Beth Israel Hospital
Mount Sinai Beth Israel, including the former Beth Israel Medical Center, in Manhattan, New York
Newark Beth Israel Medical Center in Newark, New Jersey

See also
 Beth Israel (disambiguation)
 Jewish Hospital (disambiguation)